Witch's broom or witches' broom is a deformity in a woody plant, typically a tree, where the natural structure of the plant is changed. A dense mass of shoots grows from a single point, with the resulting structure resembling a broom or a bird's nest. It is sometimes caused by pathogens.

Diseases with symptoms of witches' broom, caused by phytoplasmas or basidiomycetes, are economically important in a number of crop plants, including the cocoa tree Theobroma cacao, jujube (Ziziphus jujuba) and the timber tree Melia azedarach.

Causes
A tree's characteristic shape, or habit, is in part the product of auxins, hormones which control the growth of secondary apices. The growth of an offshoot is limited by the auxin, while that of the parent branch is not. In cases of witch's broom, the normal hierarchy of buds is interrupted, and apices grow indiscriminately. This can be caused by cytokinin, a phytohormone which interferes with growth regulation. The phenomenon can also be caused by other organisms, including fungi, oomycetes, insects, mites, nematodes, phytoplasmas, and viruses. The broom growths may last for many years, typically for the life of the host plant. If twigs of witch's brooms are grafted onto normal rootstocks, freak trees result, showing that the attacking organism has changed the inherited growth pattern of the twigs.

Ecological role
Witches' brooms provide nesting habitat for birds and mammals, such as the northern flying squirrel, which nests in them.

See also 
 Plant development § buds and shoots – atypical shoot development
 Epicormic shoot – a shoot that develops from buds under the bark
 Forest pathology
 Longan witches broom-associated virus
 Melampsora can cause different kinds of witch's brooms.
 Moniliophthora perniciosa, cause of witch's broom disease in cacao
 Phyllody, a related plant growth abnormality affecting flowers

References

External links 

 Witches' Broom at BBC h2g2.
 Fir and spruce broom

Plant pathogens and diseases